Luke White (circa 1740 or 1750 – 25 February 1824) was an Irish bookseller, operator of a lottery and Whig politician.

He started as an impecunious book dealer, first in the streets of Belfast, then from 1778 at an auction house in Dublin buying and reselling around the country. By 1798, during the Irish Rebellion, he helped the Irish government with a loan of 1 million pounds (at £65 per £100 share at 5%).

He then purchased Luttrellstown Castle from Henry Luttrell, 2nd Earl of Carhampton in 1800, and changed its name to Woodlands to eradicate the memory of its previous owner. White was High Sheriff of County Dublin for 1804 and High Sheriff of Longford for 1806. He entered the British House of Commons for Leitrim in 1818 and sat as Member of Parliament (MP) for it until his death in 1824.

On 7 February 1781, he married Elizabeth de la Mazière, by whom he had four sons and three daughters. He later married secondly, in 1800, Arabella Fortescue, daughter of William Fortescue, and had by her one son. White died in Park Street, Mayfair. He left properties worth £175,000 per annum which eventually devolved to his fourth son Henry, who was elevated to the Peerage of the United Kingdom as Baron Annaly. His second son Samuel represented the same constituency as his father and his third son, Luke White Jr., was MP for Longford.

Titles published by L. White

References

External links
 

1740 births
1824 deaths
Members of the Parliament of the United Kingdom for County Leitrim constituencies (1801–1922)
UK MPs 1812–1818
UK MPs 1818–1820
UK MPs 1820–1826
High Sheriffs of County Dublin
High Sheriffs of Longford
Irish booksellers
Whig (British political party) MPs for Irish constituencies
18th-century Irish businesspeople
19th-century Irish businesspeople